Isomerida tupi is a species of beetle in the family Cerambycidae. It was described by Martins and Galileo in 1992. It is known from Brazil and Colombia.

References

Hemilophini
Beetles described in 1992